Delettes is a commune in the Pas-de-Calais department in the Hauts-de-France region of France.

Geography
A commune of four small farming villages situated 9 miles (14 km) south of Saint-Omer, Delettes is located at the D157 and D193 crossroads. The river Lys flows by the commune.

Population

Places of interest
 The church of St.Maxime, dating from the seventeenth century.
 The church of Notre-Dame at Upen d'Amont.
 The church of Notre-Dame at Upen d'Aval.
 The war memorial. Built in 1921 and reconstructed in 1999.

See also
Communes of the Pas-de-Calais department

References

External links

 The war memorial 
 History of Delettes 
 Statistical data, INSEE

Communes of Pas-de-Calais